Christina Loukas (born December 19, 1985) is an American diver. She competes in the 3 meter springboard event.

Loukas is of Greek origin, and was born and grew up in Riverwoods, Illinois, where she studied gymnastics, swimming, and diving from an early age, before switching to diving exclusively at age twelve. She attended Deerfield High School in Deerfield, Illinois and competed in the off season with the Coho Swim Club. She later moved to Bloomington, Indiana and lives in The Woodlands, Texas.

Collegiate career
She attended Indiana University and dived for the Indiana Hoosiers, where she was an eight-time NCAA All-American. Loukas won all three diving events at the conference championships, and was one of only four Big Ten divers to accomplish that feat. She graduated in May 2009.

Competitive Diving
Loukas placed fourth at the 2008 FINA Swimming World Cup. She competed in the 2008 Summer Olympics in Beijing, China, placing ninth, and in the 2012 Summer Olympics in London, England, placing eighth.

See also
 Diving at the 2008 Summer Olympics – Women's 3 metre springboard
 Diving at the 2012 Summer Olympics - Women's 3 metre springboard

References

External links
 Christina Loukas biography from NBC Olympics site

Divers at the 2008 Summer Olympics
Divers at the 2012 Summer Olympics
Olympic divers of the United States
1985 births
Indiana University alumni
American people of Greek descent
People from Riverwoods, Illinois
Sportspeople from Bloomington, Illinois
Living people
American female divers
Universiade medalists in diving
Universiade silver medalists for the United States
Medalists at the 2007 Summer Universiade
21st-century American women